Buffalo Tom is the debut album by the American alternative rock band Buffalo Tom, released in 1988 and featuring production from J Mascis.

Critical reception
AllMusic wrote that "some bands offer up everything they have on their first album, and some bands just get started; Buffalo Tom indicates that this band was clearly in the latter category, but if they had a way to go in the originality sweepstakes, there was no arguing they had plenty of talent and potential."

Track listing 
 "Sunflower Suit"
 "The Plank"
 "Impossible"   
 "500,000 Warnings"
 "The Bus"
 "Racine" 
 "In the Attic" 
 "Flushing Stars" 
 "Walk Away"
 "Reason Why" 
 "Blue"
 "Deep in the Ground"

Personnel 
Buffalo Tom
Bill Janovitz - vocals, guitar, piano
Tom Maginnis - drums, percussion
Chris Colbourn - bass, guitar, vocals
with:
J Mascis - lead guitar on "Impossible"
Phil Retelle - backing vocals on "Flushing Stars"

Produced by J Mascis and Buffalo Tom.

Mixed by Sean Slade, engineered by Tim O'Heir.

References 

Buffalo Tom albums
1988 debut albums
Beggars Banquet Records albums
SST Records albums